Petticoat Camp is a 1912 American silent short comedy film starring William Garwood and Florence La Badie.

Plot
Only lasting 15 minutes, it is a light-hearted comedy about the battle between the sexes as several married couples go on a camp-out together. The women soon realize that the men expect them to do perform all of the work while they relax, leading to several comedic situations.

External links

1912 films
1912 comedy films
Thanhouser Company films
Silent American comedy films
American silent short films
American black-and-white films
Articles containing video clips
1912 short films
American comedy short films
1910s American films